An ambulance is a vehicle designated for the transport of sick or injured people.

Ambulance may also refer to:

Music

Performers
 Ambulance, a band with releases on the Planet Mu label
 Ambulance LTD, an American indie rock band

Albums
 Ambulance LTD (EP), by the band of the same name

Songs 
 "Ambulance", a 1997 song by Grinspoon, B-side to the single "Repeat"
 "Ambulance", a 2003 song by Blur from Think Tank
 "Ambulance", a 2004 song by TV on the Radio from Desperate Youth, Blood Thirsty Babes
 "Ambulance", a 2011 song by Eisley from The Valley
 "Ambulance", a 2012 song by My Chemical Romance from Conventional Weapons
 "Ambulances", a 2011 song by Ladytron from Gravity the Seducer

Other media 
 Ambulance (2005 film), a 2005 film
 Ambulance (2022 film), a 2022 film
 Ambulance (TV programme), a British documentary television programme
 Ambulance (video game), released in 1983
 The Ambulance, a 1990 film
 "Ambulances", a 1961 poem by Philip Larkin

Other uses 
 Ambulance (computer virus), infecting the DOS operating system

See also 

 
 Ambulance station
 Ambies, a podcast award, singularly known as 'Ambie'
 Field Ambulance, a wartime mobile medical unit
 First Call vehicle, known as a "private ambulance" in the UK